Phil Trinter (born January 8, 1969 in Lorain, Ohio) is an American Olympic sailor in the Star class. He competed in the 2004 Summer Olympics together with Paul Cayard, where they finished 5th. Trinter has also become Star World Champion two times, in 1993 and 2013.

Trinter sailed with Stars & Stripes at the 1995 America's Cup and with AmericaOne in the 2000 Louis Vuitton Cup.

He attended Indiana University, where he played football, including the 1990 Peach Bowl and three other bowl games.

References

Olympic sailors of the United States
American male sailors (sport)
Star class sailors
Sailors at the 2004 Summer Olympics – Star
American people of German descent
1969 births
Living people
1995 America's Cup sailors
Indiana Hoosiers football players
2000 America's Cup sailors
Star class world champions
World champions in sailing for the United States